Sanne Verstegen (born 10 November 1985 in Rotterdam) is a Dutch middle-distance runner specialising in the 800 metres. She represented her country at the 2017 World Championships reaching the semifinals.

She is the current national record holder in the indoor 1000 metres.

International competitions

Personal bests

Outdoor
400 metres – 53.54 (Amsterdam 2010)
600 metres – 1:28.06 (Potchefstroom 2016)
800 metres – 1:59.55 (Madrid 2017)
1000 metres – 2:37.49 (Rabat 2018)
1500 metres – 4:07.90 (Hengelo 20167)

Indoor
400 metres – 53.98 (Vienna 2010)
600 metres – 1:30.27 (Albuquerque 2015)
800 metres – 2:01.83 (Apeldoorn 2017)
1000 metres – 2:38.72 (Birmingham 2017) NR
1500 metres – 4:19.44 (Dortmund 2015)

References

1985 births
Living people
Dutch female middle-distance runners
World Athletics Championships athletes for the Netherlands
Athletes from Rotterdam
20th-century Dutch women
21st-century Dutch women